Irving Kriesberg (March 13, 1919 – November 11, 2009) was an American painter, sculptor, educator, author, and filmmaker, whose work combined elements of Abstract Expressionism with representational human, animal, and humanoid forms. Because Kriesberg blended formalist elements with figurative forms he is often considered to be a Figurative Expressionist.

Biography
Irving Kriesberg was born March 13, 1919, in Chicago, Illinois. His parents were Bessie and Max Kriesberg. Kriesberg had three brothers, Lee (born in 1915), Martin (born in 1917), and Louis (born in 1926).

As a child, Kriesberg filled sketchbooks with images of animals inspired by visits to Chicago's Field Museum of Natural History with his brother Martin. He graduated from Von Steuben High School in 1937 and studied at the School of the Art Institute of Chicago, where he received his BFA in 1941. His teachers at the School of the Art Institute included the Russian-American avant-garde painter, Boris Anisfeld.

Shortly after graduation from the School of the Art Institute of Chicago, Kriesberg traveled to Mexico City, where he lived and worked from 1941 until 1944. He studied graphic arts at the Escuela Nacional de Artes Plasticas, Mexico City and exhibited with Taller de Gráfica Popular. In 1945, Kriesberg moved to New York City and got a job animating signs in Times Square with Artkraft Strauss.

Kriesberg befriended the Cubist sculptor, Jacques Lipchitz, who introduced Kriesberg's work to Curt Valentin. Valentin, a German-Jewish art dealer, ran an eponymous art gallery on 32 east 57th Street in Manhattan, which was known for exhibiting the work of established modern artists including Pablo Picasso, Alexander Calder, Max Beckmann, and Henry Moore. Valentin exhibited Kriesberg's work as part of a group exhibition in 1953 alongside fellow artists, Reg Butler, Bruno Cassina, Jan Cox, and Alton Pickens. Kriesberg had his first solo exhibition at the Curt Valentin Gallery in 1955. Lipchitz wrote the introductory text for the exhibition catalogue.

Kriesberg had his first major museum show in 1952, when several of his paintings were selected by Dorothy Miller, curator of the Museum of Modern Art, for the landmark group exhibition, 15 Americans.15 Americans also included Jackson Pollock, Clyfford Still, Mark Rothko, Williams Baziotes, and other seminal American modern artists. In 1961, Kriesberg had a solo exhibition at the Jewish Museum. The exhibition was a 15 year career retrospective for Kriesberg, featuring works from 1945 through 1960. It also marked the debut screening of Kriesberg's 1954 animated film, Pastoral. The show at the Jewish Museum ran concurrent with a solo exhibition at Graham Gallery. Allan Kaprow wrote the essay for the Graham Gallery show catalogue, stating that "Irving Kriesberg has pushed the boundaries of his art farther than most artists. He has increased the possibilities for us all."

In 1965, Kriesberg received a Fulbright Fellowship to travel to India. He traveled the countryside and made a significant body of paintings on canvas and paper in Simla. In 1966, Kriesberg presented this work in a 1966 solo exhibition at the Kumar Gallery in New Delhi.

Kriesberg taught at several academic institutions including: Parsons School of Design, New York City (1955 - 1961), Pratt Institute, NY (1961 - 1972), Yale University (1962 - 1969), City University of New York (1969 - 1972), State University, NY (1972 - 1976), and Columbia University (1977 - 1978).

Artwork

In addition to painting, printmaking and, sculpture, Kriesberg was involved with cinematography. He created two avant-garde animations Pastoral (1954, 20 minutes, 16mm film with musical score by Douglas Townsend) and Out of Into (1972, 17 min, 16 mm film with an electric score by Bülent Arel). He received his M.A. in film from New York University in 1972.

Out of Into premiered at the Solomon R. Guggenheim museum during the exhibition 10 Independents. The exhibition was the museum's first artist initiated and organized exhibition. Kriesberg was an exhibiting artist, as well as the curator of the exhibition which also featured, Romare Bearden, Robert Beauchamp, Mary Frank, Red Grooms, Lester Johnson, Joseph Kurhajec, Maryan (Maryan S. Maryan), Peter Schumann, and H.C. Westermann.

Kriesberg also created several works of public art, including a banner for the 1989 Passover Peace Coalition rally and a 40-foot banner called Peace Dove, which was an integral visual element of the June 12th Rally for nuclear disarmament in 1982.

Selected solo exhibitions

1946 The Art Institute of Chicago (First public exhibition; 2 person show)
1954: St. Louis Art Museum, The Detroit Institute of Arts
1955: Curt Valentin Gallery, NYC
1961: Graham Gallery, NYC
1961: The Jewish Museum, NYC 
1966: Kumar Gallery, Delhi, India
1967: Yale University, New Haven, CT
1978, 80, 82: Terry Dintenfass, Inc., NYC
1979: Fairweather–Hardin Gallery, Chicago, IL
1980, 81: Brandeis University, Waltham, MA
1980: Everson Museum of Art, Syracuse, NY; Galerie Elizabeth, Chicago, IL
1981: Fiedler Gallery, Washington, D.C.
1981, 83: Jack Gallery, NYC
1982: Washington University in St. Louis; Zenith Gallery, Pittsburgh, PA
1985, 87: Graham Modern Gallery, NYC
1990: Scheele Gallery, Cleveland, OH
1992, 94: Katherina Rich Perlow Gallery, NYC
1996, 2005: Peter Findlay Gallery, NYC
2005, 08: Lori Bookstein Fine Art, NYC
2012: Longview Museum of Fine Art, Longview, Texas 
2018: Galerie Grand Siècle, Taipei City, Taiwan

Selected group exhibitions
1946: The Art Institute of Chicago
1951: New Talent Exhibition: Di Spirito; Kriesberg; Mintz, Museum of Modern Art 
1952: 15 Americans, Museum of Modern Art
1953: The Detroit Institute of Arts
1953: Curt Valentin Gallery, New York City
1954: St. Louis Art Museum, St. Louis, MO
1968: Directions I: Options, Milwaukee Art Center, Milwaukee, WI
1969: Human Concern/Personal Torment, (Curated by Robert Doty) The Whitney Museum of American Art, New York, NY
1972: Ten Independents, Solomon R. Guggenheim Museum, New York City
1979: Artists 100 Years: Alumni of The School of the Art Institute of Chicago, IL, (Curated by Katharine Kuh ) Art Institute of Chicago, Chicago, IL
1982: Peaceable Kingdom: Animal Art from the Permanent Collection, Weatherspoon Art Museum, Greensboro, NC
1984: Emotional Impact: New York School Figurative Expressionism (curated by April Kingsley) Traveled to: Anchorage Historical and Fine Arts Museum, Anchorage, AK, December 1, 1984 – January 12, 1985; Museum of Art, Inc., Ft. Lauderdale, FL, February 1–April 1, 1985; University Gallery, University of Florida, Gainesville, FL, September 1–September 29, 1985 Oklahoma Museum of Art, Oklahoma City, OK, January 19–March 2, 1986; Beaumont Art Center, Beaumont, TX, March 28–May 11, 1986; Laguna Gloria Art Museum, Austin, TX, May 23–July 6, 1986
1987: The Interior Self: Three Generations of Expressionist Painters View the Human Image, Montclair Art Museum, Montclair, N.J.
2016: Curators at Work VI, Muscarelle Museum of Art, Williamsburg, VA.
2020: Off the Wall, Anita Shapolsky Gallery, New York, NY.
2021: Imagografías de diversidad: el entre-medio de la cultura, Museo Mural Diego Rivera, Mexico City, Mexico.

Awards

Kriesberg received a Ford Foundation grant in 1965, the John Simon Guggenheim Foundation Memorial Award in 1976, a Fulbright Fellowship from 1965-1966, a National Endowment for the Arts Award in 1981, and a Lee Krasner Award from the Pollock-Krasner Foundation for a lifetime of achievement in 2002.  

In 1992, he was elected into the National Academy of Design as an Associate member, and became a full Academician in 1994.

Museum collections
Kriesberg's paintings are held in the permanent collection of over 74 American art museums including, the Museum of Modern Art, the Whitney Museum of American Art, the Corcoran Gallery, the Brooklyn Museum, the Detroit Institute of Art, the Eli and Edythe Broad Art Museum, the National Gallery, the Butler Institute of American Art, the Birmingham Museum of Art, The Jewish Museum, the University of Michigan Museum of Art, the Dayton Art Institute, the Allentown Art Museum, the Boca Raton Museum of Art, the Rose Art Museum, the Kemper Museum of Contemporary Art, the Scottsdale MoCA, and the Crocker Art Museum.

Books written by Irving Kriesberg
Looking at pictures, a guide to intelligent appreciation (Chicago: Center for the Study of Liberal Education for Adults, 1955)
Art: The Visual Experience (New York: Pitman Publishing Corporation, 1964)
Working with color: a manual for painters (New York: Prentice Hall, 1986)

References

External links
The Estate of Irving Kriesberg

1919 births
2009 deaths
20th-century American painters
American male painters
21st-century American painters
21st-century American male artists
Modern painters
Painters from New York City
Jewish American artists
Expressionist painters
20th-century American Jews
21st-century American Jews
20th-century American male artists
Parsons School of Design faculty
Yale School of Art faculty
Pratt Institute faculty